Alejandro Hamed Franco (born 1934) Paraguayan politician of Syrian descent who was appointed foreign minister by President Fernando Lugo, a term he served between 2008 - 2009. He is currently nominated to be the Paraguayan ambassador to Uruguay.

Biography 

Alejandro Hamed is of Syrian origin.

Political career
In 2008, he was controversially appointed the Foreign Minister of Paraguay by incoming president Fernando Lugo. The United States had him on a blacklist from entering their country or flying on one of their aircraft. After leaving the post in 2009, he was ambassador to Venezuela. As of 2010, he is nominated to become the ambassador to Uruguay.

Foreign policy
He was said to have "expressed sympathy" for Hugo Chávez, and been an advocate of the Palestinian cause (a move that caused consternation in the United States).

During his tenure as foreign minister, there were concerns that Paraguay would break ties with Taiwan in favour of China, this was controversial because Paraguay was the only country in South America to recognise Taiwan.

During a visit to Jordan, he discussed with his counterpart the Middle East process. He has also visited Qatar. During a visit to Iran, he told his counterpart that Paraguay was willing to make "mature economic, industrial and agricultural cooperation with Iran." He also said Paraguay would support Venezuela's entry into Mercosur. After Barack Obama's inauguration as US president he said Lugo hoped ties with the US would secure, particularly in the economic field.

He also signed an agreement with the US ambassador to Paraguay, Liliana Ayalde, to amend the Narcotics and Money Laundering Agreement. The new agreement would be used to combat drug trafficking with the US offering US$253,000.

References

1934 births
Living people
Paraguayan historians
Foreign Ministers of Paraguay
Ambassadors of Paraguay to Uruguay
Ambassadors of Paraguay to Venezuela
Paraguayan people of Syrian descent